= Hello from Heaven! =

1996 book by Bill and Judy Guggenheim

Hello From Heaven! is a 1996 book written by Bill Guggenheim and Judy Guggenheim, with the subtitle of A New Field Of Research - After-Death Communication - Confirms That Life And Love Are Eternal

The book records what the Guggenheims term after-death communications (ADCs); they were the first to use this term.

Hello From Heaven! documents the firsthand accounts of people who believe they have been contacted by a loved one who has died, otherwise known as ADCs. The Guggenheims interviewed over 2000 people in the United States and Canada and collected over 3000 ADC accounts.

Hello From Heaven! and after-death communications have been discussed on, the ABC television news show 20/20, the radio show Coast to Coast AM, and in the newspaper the Orlando Sentinel.

The book was on the bestseller's list for Apple iBooks in the category of Health, Mind and Body.
